Penicillium tarraconense is an anamorph species of fungus in the genus Penicillium which was isolated from air in Madrid in Spain.

References 

tarraconense
Fungi described in 1980